Miletus mallus is a butterfly in the family Lycaenidae. It is found in Asia.

Subspecies
 Miletus mallus mallus (Burma, Thailand, Laos, southern Vietnam)
 Miletus mallus gethusus (Fruhstorfer, 1915) (southern Yunnan, northern Vietnam)
 Miletus mallus shania (Evans, 1932) (Burma)

References

Butterflies described in 1913
Miletus (butterfly)